Chloropentamminecobalt chloride is the dichloride salt of the coordination complex [Co(NH3)5Cl]2+.  It is a red-violet, diamagnetic, water-soluble salt.  The compound has been of academic and historical interest.

Synthesis and reactions 
The salt is prepared with a two-step process starting with oxidizing a solution of cobalt chloride and ammonia.
2 CoCl2·6H2O  +  10 NH3  +  2 HCl  +  H2O2   →    2 [Co(NH3)5(OH2)]Cl3  +  12 H2O

This intermediate is then heated to induce coordination of one of the outer sphere chloride ligands:
[Co(NH3)5(OH2)]Cl3   →    [Co(NH3)5Cl]Cl2  +   H2O
The dication [Co(NH3)5Cl]2+ has idealized C4v symmetry.

In an aqueous solution, chloropentaamminecobalt(III) chloride reforms aquopentammine complex.  With concentrated sulfuric acid, chloropentaamminecobalt(III) chloride forms the hydrogen sulfate complex [Co(NH3)5OSO3H]2+.

History 
Cobalt complexes have been of long-standing interest in inorganic chemistry because they are numerous, easily prepared, and colorful. It was partly on the basis of his study of cobalt coordination chemistry that Alfred Werner was awarded the Nobel Prize in Chemistry. Prior to Werner, the models of amine complexes postulated chains of pentavalent nitrogen centers. This Jørgensen–Bloomstrand model was overthrown by Werner who introduced the idea that coordination complexes feature metal atoms of octahedral and tetrahedral shapes, with ammonia and other ligands attached individually to the metal.  Werner's model accounted for the inner sphere ligands being less reactive. In [Co(NH3)5Cl]Cl2, two chloride ions are outer sphere (counter ions) and one is bound to the Co(III) center: reaction with excess silver nitrate would immediately precipitate the two chloride counter ions, but the bound chloride ion would not be precipitated.

See also
 Pentaamminechlororhodium dichloride

References 

Cobalt complexes
Cobalt(III) compounds
Ammine complexes